The 2022 Indiana Hoosiers football team represented Indiana University in the 2022 NCAA Division I FBS football season. The Hoosiers played their home games at Memorial Stadium in Bloomington, Indiana and competed as a member of the East Division of the Big Ten Conference. The team was led by sixth-year head coach Tom Allen. They finished the season 4–8, 2–7 in Big Ten play to finish in sixth place in the East division.

Previous season

Following the Hoosiers' finish in 2020 (the best since the 1967 season), the 2021 team finished the 2021 season 2–10, 0–9 in Big Ten play to finish in last place in the East division. Indiana's two wins were against non-conference opponents Idaho and Western Kentucky.

Following the end of the 2021 season, Indiana would release or see the departure of several position coaches, including offensive coordinator Nick Sheridan (who was hired by Washington) and defensive coordinator Charlton Warren, as well as the transfer of former starting quarterback Michael Penix Jr.

Spring game
The Hoosiers did not hold an official 2022 spring game, instead choosing to have closed-practices throughout the spring, with the general public  and media not in attendance. The Hoosiers have not held an official Spring Game since 2019.

Offseason

Coaching changes
Following the release of Nick Sheridan as offensive coordinator, the Hoosiers would announce on December 9, 2021, that they had hired former UMass head coach as their new offensive coordinator; Bell had previously coached Umass from 2019-2021.

On January 31, 2022, the Notre Dame Fighting Irish announced that they had hired Indiana running backs coach Deland McCullough to the same position for their team; McCullough had previously coached for one year with the Hoosiers. On February 7, 2022, Indiana announced that they had hired former NY Giants running backs coach Craig Johnson as the Hoosiers' new running backs coach; Johnson had served as the running backs coach for the NFL's New York Giants from 2014-2019.

Transfers

Outgoing

Notable departures from the 2021 squad included:

Incoming

2022 NFL Draft

Hoosiers who were picked in the 2022 NFL Draft:

Preseason

Preseason Big Ten poll
Although the Big Ten Conference has not held an official preseason poll since 2010, Cleveland.com has polled sports journalists representing all member schools as a de facto preseason media poll since 2011. For the 2022 poll, Indiana was projected to finish last in the East Division.

Schedule
The Hoosiers' 2022 schedule consisted of seven home games and five away games. The Hoosiers played three non-conference games, against Idaho and Western Kentucky at home and on the road against Cincinnati. In conference, Indiana hosted Illinois, Michigan, Maryland, Penn State and Purdue. They traveled to Nebraska, Rutgers, Ohio State and Michigan State.

Game summaries

Illinois

Idaho

Western Kentucky

at Cincinnati

at Nebraska

No. 4 Michigan

Maryland

at Rutgers

No. 15 Penn State

at No. 2 Ohio State

at Michigan State

Purdue

Rankings

Roster

Radio
Radio coverage for all games was broadcast on IUHoosiers.com All-Access and on various radio frequencies throughout the state. The primary radio announcer was long-time broadcaster Don Fischer with Play-by-Play.

References

Indiana
Indiana Hoosiers football seasons
Indiana Hoosiers football